Bob Whyte (10 December 1907 – 15 January 1983) was a New Zealand cricketer. He played in two first-class matches for Wellington in 1934/35.

See also
 List of Wellington representative cricketers

References

External links
 

1907 births
1983 deaths
New Zealand cricketers
Wellington cricketers
Cricketers from Wellington City